Innes C. Cuthill (born 1960) is a professor of behavioural ecology at the University of Bristol. His main research interest is in camouflage, in particular how it evolves in response to the colour vision of other animals such as predators.

Life

Cuthill was educated at University College School, London. He read zoology at the University of Cambridge, graduating in 1982 and gained his D.Phil. at the University of Oxford in 1985. He worked at Oxford until 1989 when he became a lecturer at the University of Bristol. He became a professor there in 1998 and was head of the School of Biological Sciences from 2008 to 2012.

Work

Cuthill describes himself as "wear[ing] two hats, behavioural ecologist and sensory ecologist", unified by seeking to explain the "design, through natural selection, of animal form and function." He states that his main research interest is the evolution of camouflage of one kind of animal, such as prey, in response to the colour vision of another kind of animal, such as a predator.

He has contributed to over 180 research papers, mainly on vision and camouflage, though he has also written on the use of statistics in biology, cited over 1600 times, and on guidelines for reporting the use of animals in research, cited over 2000 times.

Awards and distinctions

Cuthill won the Scientific Medal of the Zoological Society of London in 1998, and the Nature and NESTA award for mentoring in science in 2005. From 2007 to 2010 he was president of the Association for the Study of Animal Behaviour. He gave the Tinbergen Lecture of 2014  and won the 2018 ASAB medal for contributions to the science of animal behaviour.

References

English biologists
1960 births
Living people
Camouflage researchers